Aghinagh House is a building in Caum Townland, County Cork, Ireland which was probably constructed sometime between 1799 and 1815. The building is an example of Irish Georgian architecture. Historical maps label the house as Ashton and Rectory.

Notable owners

The most notable owner of Aghinagh House was Lieutenant-General Sir Adrian Carton de Wiart (May 1880 through June 1963), a renowned figure in British military history. Sir Adrian is buried in the grounds of the church adjacent to Aghinagh House.

References

Buildings and structures in County Cork
Houses in the Republic of Ireland